In mathematics, specifically in order theory and functional analysis, two elements x and y of a vector lattice X are lattice disjoint or simply disjoint if , in which case we write , where the absolute value of x is defined to be . 
We say that two sets A and B are lattice disjoint or disjoint if a and b are disjoint for all a in A and all b in B, in which case we write . 
For any set A, we define the disjoint complement to be the set .

Characterizations 

Two elements x and y are disjoint if and only if . 

Properties 

Disjoint complements are always bands, but the converse is not true in general. 

Representation as a disjoint sum of positive elements 

If y ≥ 0 and x ≤ y then x+ ≤ y. 

See also 

 Solid set
 Locally convex vector lattice
 Vector lattice

References

Sources

 

Functional analysis